Scream in Blue is a live album by Midnight Oil that was released in May 1992 under the Columbia Records label.  It contains songs carefully culled from 5 live concerts recorded over a 9-year period.  The audiences sound quite large, but also included is material from a 1990 protest concert held on the street in front of Exxon headquarters in New York City.  The album is mixed so as to sound like one continuous concert.

The album starts with a scathing, nearly atonal electric guitar solo and never lets up (until the final, more subdued studio bonus track "Burnie"), careening through a hooky hard-rock minefield of clever, socially conscious lyrics sung with passion over a rip-roaring but very tight band.  The tracks were evidently recorded through the sound systems of the various concerts, then mixed to a clear and well-balanced sound in the style of audio verité.  Also, at the end of "Only the Strong", a short sound sample is inserted containing some chanting taken from "The Drum Song" with permission from Phil Fontaine.

Reception

Allmusic's review by Roch Parisien is in praise of the album, saying that it perfectly captured the edge and power of Midnight Oil's live performances, which consistently outshone the popular studio versions of the same material.

Track listing
 "Scream in Blue" 2:56 (Garrett, Moginie, Rotsey) - Hordern Pavilion, Sydney, 1984
 "Read About It" 3:52 (Garrett, Hirst, Moginie) - Brisbane Entertainment Centre, 1990
 "Dreamworld" 3:42 (Garrett, Hirst, Moginie) - Brisbane Entertainment Centre, 1990
 "Brave Faces" 5:00 (Garrett, Moginie) - Capitol Theatre, Sydney, 1982
 "Only the Strong" 5:41 (Hirst, Moginie) - Capitol Theatre, Sydney, 1982
 "Stars of Warburton" 5:04 (Garrett, Moginie) - Brisbane Entertainment Centre, 1990
 "Progress" 6:17 (Garrett, Moginie) - Exxon Protest, 6th Ave, New York City, 1990
 "Beds Are Burning" 4:05 (Garrett, Hirst, Moginie) - Our Common Future Concert, Darlinghurst, 1989
 "Sell My Soul" 4:10 (Garrett, Moginie) - Brisbane Entertainment Centre, 1990
 "Sometimes" 3:29 (Garrett, Hirst, Moginie) - Our Common Future Concert, Darlinghurst, 1989
 "Hercules" 4:57 (Garrett, Hirst, Moginie) - Brisbane Entertainment Centre, 1990
 "Powderworks" 5:50 (Garrett, Hirst, James, Moginie, Rotsey) - Capitol Theatre, Sydney, 1982
 "Burnie" 5:04 (Garrett, Moginie) - Bonus Track, Acoustic Recording - Albert Studios, Sydney, 1992

Charts

Certifications

Personnel
 Peter Garrett - lead vocals
 Peter Gifford - bass, vocals (tracks 1, 4, 5, and 12)
 Bones Hillman - bass, vocals (tracks 2, 3, 6-11, and 13)
 Rob Hirst - drums, vocals
 Jim Moginie - guitars, keyboards, vocals
 Martin Rotsey - guitars, vocals

References

External links
 Midnight Oil

Midnight Oil live albums
Sprint Music albums
1992 live albums
Columbia Records live albums